William Arce was a college baseball coach. He was founding director of the athletic program at the Claremont Colleges in California, and the baseball facility there is named after him.

Arce served as head coach of the baseball team from 1958 to 1979, compiling a record of 446-354-16 and leading the Stags to Southern California Intercollegiate Athletic Conference championships in 1970, 1971, and 1975.  He was named as one of the five finalists in the baseball coach of the year award by the American Association of College Baseball Coaches in 1975. Arce was inducted into the NAIA Hall of Fame 1976.  In 2000, he was awarded the Lefty Gomez Award in 2000 by the American Baseball Coaches Association.

After retiring, Arce committed his summers and sabbatical leaves to developing baseball internationally. He was the first American baseball coach to have provided baseball instruction in Sweden (1962), Czechoslovakia (1969), Yugoslavia (1979), and the People's Republic of China (1980). Arce also coached the national teams of both the Netherlands (1971) and Italy (1975) to the European Baseball Championship. In 1985, Arce founded International Sports Group, a non-profit organization that conducts international coaching clinics. Arce was also on the coaching staff for the U.S. national teams in 1970, 1976, and 1978.

Arce was also a veteran of World War II, having fought in the Battle of the Bulge in 1944.

Bill Arce died in March 2016 aged 90 years old.

References

Claremont-Mudd-Scripps Stags and Athenas athletic directors
Claremont-Mudd-Scripps Stags baseball coaches
2016 deaths
Year of birth missing (living people)